Brahmanpally is a village in Rangareddy district in Telangana, India. It falls under Hayathnagar mandal. It is close to the Outer Ring Road, Hyderabad.

References

Villages in Ranga Reddy district